Bis(chloroethyl) ether is an organic compound with the formula O(CH2CH2Cl)2. It is an ether with two 2-chloroethyl substituents.  It is a colorless liquid with the odor of a chlorinated solvent.

Reactions and applications
Bis(chloroethyl) ether is less reactive than the corresponding sulfur mustard S(CH2CH2Cl)2.  In the presence of base, it reacts with catechol to form dibenzo-18-crown-6:

Bis(chloroethyl) ether can be used in the synthesis of the cough suppressant fedrilate. It is combined with benzyl cyanide and two molar equivalents of sodamide in a ring-forming reaction.  When treated with strong base, it gives divinyl ether, an anesthetic:
O(CH2CH2Cl)2  +  2 KOH   →   O(CH=CH2)2  +  2 KCl  +  2 H2O

Toxicity
The  is 74 mg/kg (oral, rat).  Bis(chloroethyl) ether is considered as a potential carcinogen.

See also
 Bis(chloromethyl) ether
 Sulfur mustard

References

Ethers
Organochlorides
Alkylating agents
IARC Group 3 carcinogens
Chloroethyl compounds